Toby is the seventh studio album by American soul group The Chi-Lites, produced by lead singer Eugene Record.  The album was released in 1974 on the Brunswick label.

History
By 1974, Brunswick had started to struggle financially so Toby was less heavily-promoted than the group's previous albums and fared less well commercially.  It was the first Chi-Lites album since 1970 to stall outside the R&B top 10 (peaking at #12) and to miss the top 100 on the Pop listings.  Three singles from the album were top 20 R&B hits.  In the UK however, where the Chi-Lites had previously established themselves as a successful singles group, none of the issued singles made any impact on the national chart.

Track listing

Charts

Singles

References

External links
Toby at Discogs

1974 albums
The Chi-Lites albums
Brunswick Records albums
Albums produced by Eugene Record